Schoenobius is a genus of moths of the family Crambidae and typical of the subfamily Schoenobiinae. Species are found mostly in Europe.

Species
Schoenobius arimatheella (Schaus, 1922)
Schoenobius damienella (Schaus, 1922)
Schoenobius endochalybella (Hampson, 1896)
Schoenobius endochralis (Hampson, 1919)
Schoenobius flava (de Joannis, 1930)
Schoenobius gigantella (Denis & Schiffermüller, 1775)
Schoenobius immeritalis Walker, 1859
Schoenobius irrorata (Hampson, 1919)
Schoenobius latignathosius Amsel, 1956
Schoenobius molybdoplecta (Dyar, 1914)
Schoenobius parabolistes
Schoenobius pyraustalis Hampson, 1919
Schoenobius retractalis (Hampson, 1919)
Schoenobius sagitella (Hampson, 1896)
Schoenobius scirpus Chen & Wu, 2014
Schoenobius vittatalis (Hampson, 1919)
Schoenobius vittatus Möschler, 1882

Former species
Schoenobius attenuata Hampson, 1919
Schoenobius bipunctatus Rothschild in Sjöstedt, 1926
Schoenobius caminarius Zeller, 1852
Schoenobius hasegawai Shibuya, 1927
Schoenobius ignitalis Hampson, 1919
Schoenobius incertellus Walker, 1863
Schoenobius melanostigmus Turner, 1922

References

Schoenobiinae
Crambidae genera
Taxa named by Philogène Auguste Joseph Duponchel